Cardon is a surname. Notable people with the surname include:

Antoine Cardon (1739–1822), Belgian painter
Lon Cardon, American geneticist
Pierre Cardon (1894–?), French World War I balloon buster
Rebecca Cardon (born 1975), American actress
Roland Cardon (1929–2001), Belgian composer and musician
Sam Cardon, American composer
Zoe G. Cardon, American ecosystems ecologist

See also 

Carlon